Bruckner's Psalm 22, WAB 34, is a setting of a German version of Psalm 23, which was psalm 22 in the Vulgata.

History 

Amongst the five psalm settings composed by Bruckner, Psalm 22 is the only one with piano accompaniment. The work was composed in circa 1852 in St. Florian, but it is unknown when it was performed at that time.

The manuscript is stored in the archive of the St. Florian monastery. The first known performance occurred on 11 October 1921 in St. Florian by Franz Xaver Müller. It was first published in Band II/2, pp. 119–130 of the Göllerich/Auer biography.

Text 
 (The Lord is shepherd and caregiver)

Setting 
The 131-bar work in E-flat major is scored for  choir and soloists, and piano.

The setting of the first part is in general homophone, with a few imitations on "So will ich nichts Übles fürchten", "Du has bereitet einen Tisch", "wie herrlich ist er!" and "Und deine Barmherzigkeit". As in Bruckner's contemporaneous Magnificat the verses are sung as an Arioso alternatingly by the choir and the soloists. From bar 43 onwards, the last verse is sung by the choir as a fugue, which evolves, on bar 115, in an ending a cappella Chorale.

Discography
There are two recordings of this work:
 Franz Farnberger, Anton Bruckner in St. Florian – Requiem & Motetten, St. Florianer Sängerknaben, Studio SM D2639 SM 44, 1997.This performance, which was recorded in the St. Florian Abbey, provides the listener with a whiff of authenticity.
 Thomas Kerbl, Anton Bruckner – Chöre & Klaviermusik, Chorvereinigung Bruckner 09 and Kammerchor der Anton Bruckner Privatuniversität Linz, CD Bruckner Haus LIVA 034, 2009

References

Sources 
 August Göllerich, Anton Bruckner. Ein Lebens- und Schaffens-Bild,  – posthumous edited by Max Auer by G. Bosse, Regensburg, 1932
 Cornelis van Zwol, Anton Bruckner - Leven en Werken, Thot, Bussum (Netherlands), 2012. 
 John Williamson, The Cambridge Companion to Bruckner, Cambridge University Press, 2004. 
 Uwe Harten, Anton Bruckner. Ein Handbuch. , Salzburg, 1996. .
 Anton Bruckner – Sämtliche Werke, Band XX/2: Psalm 22 (1852), Musikwissenschaftlicher Verlag der Internationalen Bruckner-Gesellschaft, Paul Hawkshaw (Editor), Vienna, 1997

External links 
 
 Psalm 22 (23) Es-Dur, WAB 34 Critical discography by Hans Roelofs  
  
 Anton Bruckner Critical Complete Edition – Psalms and Magnificat

Psalms by Anton Bruckner
Choral compositions
Compositions in E-flat major